Serge Legrand (born 16 July 1937) is a French biathlete. He competed in the 4 x 7.5 kilometre relay event at the 1968 Winter Olympics.

References

1939 births
Living people
French male biathletes
Olympic biathletes of France
Biathletes at the 1968 Winter Olympics
Place of birth missing (living people)